61st parallel may refer to:

61st parallel north, a circle of latitude in the Northern Hemisphere
61st parallel south, a circle of latitude in the Southern Hemisphere